Bertram Mee OBE (25 December 1918 – 21 October 2001) was an English footballer who played as a winger for Derby County and Mansfield Town. Mee was also a manager, noted for leading Arsenal to their first Double win in 1971.

Playing career
Born in Highbury Vale, Nottingham, Mee played for Derby County and Mansfield Town. In 1940–41, Mee made 16 guest appearances for Southampton, scoring twice.

After his playing career was cut short by injury, Mee joined the Royal Army Medical Corps where he trained as a physiotherapist and spent six years, rising to the rank of sergeant. After leaving, he worked for various football clubs as a physiotherapist before joining Arsenal in 1960, succeeding Billy Milne.

Managerial career

Arsenal
After the sacking of Billy Wright in 1966, the club asked Mee to become manager, a highly surprising move, perhaps even to the man himself; Mee asked for a get-out clause for him to return to physiotherapist after twelve months if it didn't work out. Mee recruited Dave Sexton and Don Howe as his assistants, in order to make up for any tactical shortcomings of his own.

Arsenal hadn't won a trophy since 1953, but, under Mee, with a crop of players from Arsenal's youth system, such as Charlie George, John Radford, Pat Rice and Ray Kennedy, began to show promise. Arsenal reached two successive League Cup finals in 1968 and 1969, but lost them both to Leeds United and Swindon Town respectively. However, the following season, the club won its first European trophy and its first trophy of any kind for 17 years, beating Anderlecht to claim the Inter-Cities Fairs Cup, 4–3 on aggregate. After being 3-0 down in the away leg, Arsenal grabbed a late consolation and then beat the Belgian side 3–0 at Highbury.

The Fairs Cup was only the warm-up for the main act, namely the FA Cup and League Double win in 1971. The League title was won at White Hart Lane, home of their deadly rivals Tottenham Hotspur, on Monday 3 May, the last day of the season; five days later Arsenal beat Liverpool 2–1 at Wembley after extra-time, the winning goal scored by Charlie George. It was only the second time a club had won a Double in the twentieth century.

Arsenal had ambitions to retain their title the following season and signed Alan Ball from Everton. However their league campaign faltered and their hopes of a trophy depended on the FA Cup, where Arsenal had again reached the final, this time facing Leeds. Arsenal lost by a single goal. In the 1972–73 season Arsenal managed a serious championship challenge, at one point topping the table, but eventually finished runners-up. A run in the FA Cup was brought to an end by a semi final defeat to eventual winners Sunderland.

Mee then began to break up the team which had won the double, and players such as Ray Kennedy, Charlie George and captain Frank McLintock departed. Mee announced his resignation in 1976 as Arsenal's most successful manager in terms of victories with 241 wins, a number that would not be surpassed until 2006 by Arsène Wenger. Mee was succeeded by Terry Neill.

Post-Arsenal

He would later join Watford as assistant to Graham Taylor in 1978 in charge of scouting, and later became a director of the Hornets before retiring in 1991.

Mee was made an OBE in 1984 for services to football. He was the younger brother of fellow footballer Georgie Mee.

Mee died on 21 October 2001. In 2008, Mee was inducted into the National Football Museum's Hall of Fame.

Honours

Managerial

Arsenal 
Football League First Division: 1970–71 runner up: 1972–73
FA Cup: 1970–71 runner up: 1971–72
Inter-Cities Fairs Cup: 1969–70
Football League Cup runner up: 1967–68, 1968–69

Individual
Manager of the Year - 1971
Order of the British Empire - 1984
National Football Museum: English Football Hall of Fame - 2008

See also 
 List of English football championship winning managers

References

1918 births
2001 deaths
English footballers
Derby County F.C. players
Mansfield Town F.C. players
Burton Albion F.C. players
Maccabi Netanya F.C. players
English football managers
English Football Hall of Fame inductees
Arsenal F.C. managers
Officers of the Order of the British Empire
Arsenal F.C. non-playing staff
Watford F.C. non-playing staff
Watford F.C. directors
People from Bulwell
Footballers from Nottinghamshire
Southampton F.C. wartime guest players
Association football physiotherapists
Association football wingers
British Army personnel of World War II
Royal Army Medical Corps soldiers
Association football scouts